John II (died 919) was the duke of Naples from 915 to his death. He succeeded his father Gregory IV on the latter's death late in 915.

He had accompanied his father to the Battle of the Garigliano under Nicholas Picingli, where the Christian coalition defeated the Moslems of the fortress on the Garigliano.

919 deaths
10th-century dukes of Naples
Year of birth unknown